The Zen Center of Los Angeles (ZCLA), temple name Buddha Essence Temple, is a Zen center founded by Hakuyu Taizan Maezumi  in 1967 that practices in the White Plum lineage.

ZCLA observes a daily schedule of zazen, Buddhist services, and work practice. The Center's programs include introductory classes, sesshin, workshops and training periods, as well as face-to-face meetings with Abbot Wendy Egyoku Nakao and other Center teachers. The sangha practices zazen and koan training in the Maezumi-Glassman lineage.

ZCLA's mission is to know the Self, maintain the precepts, and serve others. The Center serves by providing the teaching, training, and transmission of Zen Buddhism. ZCLA's vision is an enlightened world in which suffering is transcended, all beings live in harmony, everyone has enough, deep wisdom is realized, and compassion flows unhindered.

See also
Buddhism in the United States
Timeline of Zen Buddhism in the United States

Gallery

Notes

References

Buddhism in Los Angeles
Religious buildings and structures in Los Angeles
White Plum Asanga
Zen centers in California
Mid-Wilshire, Los Angeles
Japanese-American culture in Los Angeles